Jala Kendua is a census town in Panchla CD Block of Howrah Sadar subdivision in Howrah district in the Indian state of West Bengal.

Geography

Demographics
As per 2011 Census of India Jala Kendua had a total population of 6,658 of which 3,375 (51%) were males and 3,283 (49%) were females. Population below 6 years was 1,029. The total number of literates in Jala Kendua was 4,290 (76.21% of the population over 6 years).   
   
 India census, Jala Kendua had a population of 5,783. Males constitute 49% of the population and females 51%. Jala Kendua has an average literacy rate of 50%, lower than the national average of 59.5%: male literacy is 56%, and female literacy is 44%. In Jala Kendua, 18% of the population is under 6 years of age.

References

Cities and towns in Howrah district